"Explodera" is a song written and recorded by Staffan Hellstrand, acting as official fight song for the Sweden men's national team during the 2000 UEFA European Soccer Championship in Belgium and the Netherlands. The single peaked at number eight on the Swedish Singles Chart, and also appeared on the 2000 compilation album Staffan Hellstrands bästa.

The song also charted at Trackslistan for six weeks between 6 May-10 June 2000, peaking at number six. The song also received a  Svensktoppen test on 27 May 2000, but failed to enter the chart.

In 2004, the song was recorded by Fässbergs IF.

Contributors
Staffan Hellstrand, vocals, keyboard
Michael Sellers - guitar
Christer Jansson, Conny Städe - drums
Sweden men's national football team - vocals

Charts

References

2000 singles
Football songs and chants
Swedish-language songs
Sweden national football team
Sweden at UEFA Euro 2000
Songs written by Staffan Hellstrand
2000 songs
Songs about the Netherlands